Nova Scotia (also known as Mi'kma'ki and Acadia) is a Canadian province located in Canada's Maritimes. The region was initially occupied by Mi'kmaq. The colonial history of Nova Scotia includes the present-day Canadian Maritime provinces and the northern part of Maine (Sunbury County, Nova Scotia), all of which were at one time part of Nova Scotia. In 1763 Cape Breton Island and St. John's Island (now Prince Edward Island) became part of Nova Scotia. In 1769, St. John's Island became a separate colony. Nova Scotia included present-day New Brunswick until that province was established in 1784. (In 1765, the county of Sunbury was created, and included the territory of present-day New Brunswick and eastern Maine as far as the Penobscot River.) During the first 150 years of European settlement, the colony was primarily made up of Catholic Acadians, Maliseet and Mi'kmaq. During the latter seventy-five years of this time period, there were six colonial wars that took place in Nova Scotia (see the Seven Years' War as well as Dummer's War and Father Le Loutre's War). After agreeing to several peace treaties, this long period of warfare ended with the Halifax Treaties (1761) and two years later when the British defeated the French in North America (1763). During these wars, Acadians, Mi'kmaq and Maliseet from the region fought to protect the border of Acadia from New England. They fought the war on two fronts: the southern border of Acadia, which New France defined as the Kennebec River in southern Maine. The other front was in Nova Scotia and involved preventing New Englanders from taking the capital of Acadia, Port Royal (See Queen Anne's War), establishing themselves at Canso.

During the Seven Years' War, Halifax was established as the British Headquarters of the North American Station (see Royal Naval Dockyard, Halifax). As a result, Nova Scotia was active throughout the American Revolution and the American War of 1812. The North Atlantic archipelago of Bermuda (or the Somers Isles), originally part of Virginia, was grouped as part of British America until 1783, thereafter remaining part of British North America until left out of the Confederation of Canada. Militarily, the Bermuda Garrison fell under the Commander-in-Chief in Nova Scotia 'til Canadian confederation resulted in the abolishment of this British Army command. The Royal Navy permanently established a base in Bermuda in 1795 and by 1812 this alternated seasonally with Halifax as main base for the North America Station, becoming the main base year 'round in the 1820s. Both Halifax and Bermuda were designated Imperial fortresses (along with Malta and Gibraltar). During the Victorian Era, Nova Scotians also played prominent roles in the Crimean War and the Indian Mutiny. The province also participated in the North-West Rebellion and the Second Boer War. During the twentieth century the province produced numerous people who fought in World War I and World War II. There was a small number of Nova Scotians who also participated in the Spanish Civil War, the Korean War, and the war in Afghanistan.

Seventeenth century

Port Royal established 

The first European settlement in Nova Scotia was established in 1605. The French, led by Pierre Dugua, Sieur de Monts established the first capital for the colony Acadia at Port Royal, Nova Scotia. Other than a few trading posts around the province, for the next seventy-five years, Port Royal was virtually the only European settlement in Nova Scotia. Port Royal (later renamed Annapolis Royal) remained the capital of Acadia and later Nova Scotia for almost 150 years, prior to the founding of Halifax in 1749.

Approximately seventy-five years after Port Royal was founded, Acadians migrated from the capital and established what would become the other major Acadian settlements before the Expulsion of the Acadians: Grand Pré, Chignecto, Cobequid and Pisiguit.

The English made six attempts to conquer the capital of Acadia which they finally did in the Siege of Port Royal in 1710. Over the following fifty years, the French and their allies made six unsuccessful military attempts to regain the capital.

Scottish and French Conflict 
From 1629 to 1632, Nova Scotia briefly became a Scottish colony. Sir William Alexander of Menstrie Castle, Scotland claimed mainland Nova Scotia and settled at Port Royal, while Ochiltree claimed Ile Royale (present-day Cape Breton Island) and settled at Baleine, Nova Scotia. There were three battles between the Scottish and the French: the Raid on Saint John (1632), the Siege of Baleine (1629) as well as Siege of Cap de Sable (present-day Port La Tour, Nova Scotia) (1630). Nova Scotia was returned to France via the Treaty of Saint-Germain-en-Laye (1632).

The French quickly defeated the Scottish at Baleine and established settlements on Ile Royale at present day Englishtown (1629) and St. Peter's (1630). These two settlements remained the only settlements on the island until they were abandoned by Nicolas Denys in 1659. Ile Royale then remained vacant for more than fifty years until the communities were re-established when Louisbourg was established in 1713.

Acadian Civil War 

Acadia was plunged into what some historians have described as a civil war between 1640 and 1645. The war was between Port Royal, where Governor of Acadia Charles de Menou d'Aulnay de Charnisay was stationed, and present-day Saint John, New Brunswick, where Governor of Acadia. Charles de Saint-Étienne de la Tour was stationed.

In the war, there were four major battles. la Tour attacked d'Aulnay at Port Royal in 1640. In response to the attack, D'Aulnay sailed out of Port Royal to establish a five-month blockade of La Tour's fort at Saint John, which La Tour eventually defeated (1643). La Tour attacked d'Aulnay again at Port Royal in 1643. d'Aulnay and Port Royal ultimately won the war against La Tour with the 1645 siege of Saint John. After d'Aulnay died (1650), La Tour re-established himself in Acadia.

In 1674, the Dutch briefly conquered Acadia, renaming the colony New Holland.

King Philips War 
During King Philips War, the governor was absent from Acadia (having first been imprisoned in Boston during the Dutch occupation of Acadia) and Jean-Vincent d'Abbadie de Saint-Castin was established at the capital of Acadia, Pentgouet. From there he worked with the Abenaki of Acadia to raid British settlements migrating over the border of Acadia. British retaliation included attacking deep into Acadia in the Battle off Port La Tour (1677).

Wabanaki Confederacy 

In response to King Phillips War in New England (which included the first military conflict between the Mi'kmaq and New England), the Mi'kmaq and Maliseet people from this region joined the Wabanaki Confederacy to form a political and military alliance with New France.  The Mi'kmaq and Maliseet were very significant military allies to New France through six wars.

King William's War 

During King William's War, the Mi'kmaq, Acadians and Maliseet participated in defending Acadia at its border with New England, which New France defined as the Kennebec River in southern Maine. Toward this end, the Maliseet from their headquarters at Meductic on the Saint John River, joined the New France expedition against present-day Bristol, Maine (the Siege of Pemaquid (1689)), Salmon Falls and present-day Portland, Maine. In response, the New Englanders retaliated by attacking Port Royal and present-day Guysborough. In 1694, the Maliseet participated in the Raid on Oyster River at present-day Durham, New Hampshire. Two years later, New France, led by Pierre Le Moyne d'Iberville, returned and fought a naval battle in the Bay of Fundy before moving on to raid Bristol, Maine again. In retaliation, the New Englanders, led by Benjamin Church, engaged in a Raid on Chignecto (1696) and the siege of the Capital of Acadia at Fort Nashwaak. After the Siege of Pemaquid (1696), d'Iberville led a force of 124 Canadians, Acadians, Mi'kmaq and Abenakis in the Avalon Peninsula Campaign. They destroyed almost every English settlement in Newfoundland, over 100 English were killed, many times that number captured, and almost 500 deported to England or France.

At the end of the war England returned the territory to France in the Treaty of Ryswick and the borders of Acadia remained the same.

Eighteenth century

Queen Anne's War 

During Queen Anne's War, the Mi'kmaq, Acadians and Maliseet participated again in defending Acadia at its border against New England. They made numerous raids on New England settlements along the border in the Northeast Coast Campaign, the most famous being the Raid on Deerfield. In retaliation, Major Benjamin Church went on his fifth and final expedition to Acadia. He raided present-day Castine, Maine and then continued on by conducting raids against Grand Pre, Pisiquid and Chignecto. A few years later, defeated in the Siege of Pemaquid (1696), Captain March made an unsuccessful Siege of Port Royal in 1707. The New Englanders were successful with the Siege of Port Royal (1710), while the Wabanaki Confederacy were successful in the nearby Battle of Bloody Creek in 1711.

During Queen Anne's War, the Conquest of Acadia (1710) was confirmed by the Treaty of Utrecht of 1713. Acadia was defined as mainland-Nova Scotia by the French. Present-day New Brunswick and most of Maine remained contested territory, while New England conceded present-day Prince Edward Island and Cape Breton Island, which France quickly renamed Île St Jean and Île Royale (Cape Breton Island) respectively. On the latter island, the French established a fortress at Louisbourg to guard the sea approaches to Quebec.

40th Regiment of Foot 
The 40th Regiment of Foot was the first British regiment to be raised in Nova Scotia and was commanded directly by four consecutive Governors of Nova Scotia over a period of forty-two years. The regiment was raised by General Richard Philipps in August 1717 out of independent companies stationed in North America and the West Indies. The Regiment was first known as Philipp's regiment (1717–1749), Cornwallis' Regiment (1749–1752). In 1751, the regiment was numbered the "40th Regiment of Foot" and became known as 40th Hopson's Regiment (1752–1759). The 40th fought through Father Rale's War, King George's War, Father Le Loutre's War and then the Seven Years' War.

Father Rale's War 
During the escalation that preceded Father Rale's War (1722–1725), Mi'kmaq raided the new fort Fort William Augustus at Canso, Nova Scotia (1720). Under potential siege, in May 1722, Lieutenant Governor John Doucett took 22 Mi'kmaq hostage at Annapolis Royal to prevent the capital from being attacked. In July 1722 the Abenaki and Mi'kmaq created a blockade of Annapolis Royal, with the intent of starving the capital. The natives captured 18 fishing vessels and prisoners from present-day Yarmouth to Canso. They also seized prisoners and vessels from the Bay of Fundy.

As a result of the escalating conflict, Massachusetts Governor Samuel Shute officially declared war on July 22, 1722.  The first battle of Father Rale's War happened in the Nova Scotia theatre.  In response to the blockade of Annapolis Royal, at the end of July 1722, New England launched a campaign to end the blockade and retrieve over 86 New England prisoners taken by the natives. One of these operations resulted in the Battle at Jeddore.  The next was a raid on Canso in 1723.

The worst moment of the war for the capital came in early July 1724 when a group of sixty Mikmaq and Maliseets raided Annapolis Royal. They killed and scalped a sergeant and a private, wounded four more soldiers, and terrorized the village. They also burned houses and took prisoners.  The British responded by executing one of the Mi'kmaq hostages on the same spot the sergeant was killed. They also burned three Acadian houses in retaliation.

As a result of the raid, three blockhouses were built to protect the town. The Acadian church was moved closer to the fort so that it could be more easily monitored.

In 1725, sixty Abenakis and Mi'kmaq launched another attack on Canso, destroying two houses and killing six people.

The treaty that ended the war marked a significant shift in European relations with the Mi'kmaq and Maliseet. For the first time a European Empire formally acknowledged that its dominion over Nova Scotia would have to be negotiated with the region's indigenous inhabitants. The treaty was invoked as recently as 1999 in the Donald Marshall case.

King George's War 

[[File:The taking of the 'Nuestra Senora de les Remedios' by the 'Prince Frederick', 'Duke' and 'Prince George' Privateers, 5th February 1746 RMG PX9663.jpg|thumb|Led by Commander George Walker, the "Royal Family" (King George, Prince Frederick, Duke' and Prince George Privateers) take the Nuestra Senora de les Remedios off Louisbourg, 5th February 1746]]
News of war declarations reached the French fortress at Louisbourg first, on May 3, 1744, and the forces there wasted little time in beginning hostilities, which would become known as King George's War. Concerned about their overland supply lines to Quebec, they first raided the British fishing port of Canso on May 23, and then organized an attack on Annapolis Royal, then the capital of Nova Scotia. However, French forces were delayed in departing Louisbourg, and their Mi'kmaq and Maliseet allies decided to attack on their own in early July. Annapolis had received news of the war declaration, and was somewhat prepared when the Indians began besieging Fort Anne. Lacking heavy weapons, the Indians withdrew after a few days. Then, in mid-August, a larger French force arrived before Fort Anne, but was also unable to mount an effective attack or siege against the garrison, which was relieved by the New England company of Gorham's Rangers. In 1745, British colonial forces conducted the Siege of Port Toulouse (St. Peter's) and then captured Fortress Louisbourg after a siege of six weeks. France launched a major expedition to recover Acadia in 1746. Beset by storms, disease, and finally the death of its commander, the Duc d'Anville, it returned to France in tatters without reaching its objective.

 Father Le Loutre's War 

Despite the British takeover of the capital at the Siege of Port Royal in 1710, Nova Scotia remained primarily occupied by Catholic Acadians and Mi'kmaq. To prevent the establishment of Protestant settlements in the region, Mi'kmaq raided the early British settlements of present-day Shelburne (1715) and Canso (1720). A generation later, Father Le Loutre's War began when Edward Cornwallis arrived to establish Halifax with 13 transports on June 21, 1749. After settling Halifax, the British quickly began to build other settlements. To guard against Mi'kmaq, Acadian and French attacks on the new Protestant settlements, British fortifications were erected in Halifax (Citadel Hill) (1749), Bedford (Fort Sackville) (1749), Dartmouth (1750), Lunenburg (1753) and Lawrencetown (1754). In the first year of settlement in Lunenburg, poor conditions led weary (mostly Foreign Protestant) settlers tired of resettlement to rise up in insurrection against the British in The Lunenburg Rebellion (1753), led by army captain John Hoffman, with support from Le Loutre. There were numerous Mi'kmaq and Acadian raids on these villages such as the Raid on Dartmouth (1751).

Within 18 months of establishing Halifax, the British also took firm control of peninsula Nova Scotia by building fortifications in all the major Acadian communities: present-day Windsor (Fort Edward); Grand Pre (Fort Vieux Logis) and Chignecto (Fort Lawrence). (A British fort already existed at the other major Acadian centre of Annapolis Royal, Nova Scotia. Cobequid remained without a fort.) There were numerous Mi'kmaq and Acadian raids on these fortifications such as the Siege of Grand Pre.

 Seven Years' War 
 The final colonial war was the Seven Years' War. The British Siege of Port Royal happened in 1710. Over the next forty-five years the Acadians refused to sign an unconditional oath of allegiance to Britain. During this time period Acadians participated in various militia operations against the British and maintained vital supply lines to the French Fortress of Louisbourg and Fort Beausejour.

During the Seven Years' War, the British sought to neutralize any military threat Acadians posed and to interrupt the vital supply lines Acadians provided to Louisbourg by deporting Acadians from Acadia.

The British began the Expulsion of the Acadians with the Bay of Fundy Campaign (1755). Over the next nine years over 12,000 Acadians were removed from Nova Scotia.  During the various campaigns of the expulsion, the Acadian and Native resistance to the British intensified.

 British deportation campaigns 

 Bay of Fundy (1755) 

The first wave of the expulsion began on August 10, 1755, with the Bay of Fundy Campaign (1755) during the Seven Years' War. The British ordered the expulsion of the Acadians after the Battle of Beausejour (1755). The Campaign started at Chignecto and then quickly moved to Grand Pre, Piziquid (Falmouth/ Windsor, Nova Scotia) and finally Annapolis Royal.

On November 17, 1755, during the Bay of Fundy Campaign at Chignecto, George Scott took 700 troops and attacked twenty houses at Memramcook. They arrested the Acadians who remained and killed two hundred head of livestock, to deprive the French of supplies. Many Acadians tried to escape the Expulsion by retreating to St. John and Petitcodiac rivers, and the Miramichi in New Brunswick. The British cleared the Acadians from these areas in the later campaigns of Petitcodiac River, St. John River, and the Gulf of St. Lawrence in 1758.

 Cape Sable 

Cape Sable included Port La Tour and the surrounding area (a much larger area than simply Cape Sable Island). In April 1756, Major Preble and his New England troops, on their return to Boston, raided a settlement near Port La Tour and captured 72 men, women and children.

In the late summer of 1758, Major Henry Fletcher led the 35th Regiment and a company of Gorham's Rangers to Cape Sable. He cordoned off the cape and sent his men through it. One hundred Acadians and Father Jean Baptiste de Gray surrendered, while about 130 Acadians and seven Mi'kmaq escaped. The Acadian prisoners were taken to Georges Island in Halifax Harbour.

En route to the St. John River Campaign in September 1758, Moncton sent Major Roger Morris, in command of two men-of-war and transport ships with 325 soldiers, to deport more Acadians. On October 28, his troops sent the women and children to Georges Island. The men were kept behind and forced to work with troops to destroy their village. On October 31, they were also sent to Halifax. In the spring of 1759, Joseph Gorham and his rangers arrived to take prisoner the remaining 151 Acadians. They reached Georges Island with them on June 29.

 Ile St. Jean and Ile Royale 

The second wave of the Deportation began with the French defeat at the Siege of Louisbourg (1758). Thousands of Acadians were deported from Ile Saint-Jean (Prince Edward Island) and Ile Royale (Cape Breton). The Ile Saint-Jean Campaign resulted in the largest percentage of deaths of the Acadians deported. The highest single event total of fatalities during the Deportation occurred with the sinking of the Violet, with about 280 persons aboard, and the Duke William, with over 360 persons aboard. By the time the second wave of the expulsion had begun, the British had discarded their policy of relocating the Catholic, French-speaking colonists to the Thirteen Colonies. They deported them directly to France. In 1758, hundreds of Ile Royale Acadians fled to one of Boishebert's refugee camps south of Baie des Chaleurs.

 Petitcodiac River Campaign 

This was a series of British military operations from June to November 1758 to deport the Acadians who either lived along the river or had taken refuge there from earlier deportation operations, such as the Ile Saint-Jean Campaign. Benoni Danks and Joseph Gorham's Rangers carried out the operation.

Contrary to Governor Lawrence's direction, New England Ranger Danks engaged in frontier warfare against the Acadians. On July 1, 1758, Danks himself began to pursue the Acadians on the Petiticodiac. They arrived at present day Moncton and Danks’ Rangers ambushed about thirty Acadians, who were led by Joseph Broussard (Beausoleil). Many were driven into the river, three of them were killed and scalped, and others were captured. Broussard was seriously wounded.   Danks reported that the scalps were Mi’kmaq and received payment for them. Thereafter, he went down in local lore as "one of the most reckless and brutal" of the Rangers.

 St. John River Campaign 

Colonel Robert Monckton led a force of 1150 British soldiers to destroy the Acadian settlements along the banks of the Saint John River until they reached the largest village of Sainte-Anne des Pays-Bas (present day Fredericton, New Brunswick) in February 1759. Monckton was accompanied by New England Rangers led by Joseph Goreham, Captain Benoni Danks, Moses Hazen and George Scott. The British started at the bottom of the river with raiding Kennebecais and Managoueche (City of Saint John), where the British built Fort Frederick. Then they moved up the river and raided Grimross (Gagetown, New Brunswick), Jemseg, and finally they reached Sainte-Anne des Pays-Bas.

Contrary to Governor Lawrence's direction, New England Ranger Lieutenant Hazen engaged in frontier warfare against the Acadians in what has become known as the "Ste Anne's Massacre". On 18 February 1759, Lieutenant Hazen and about fifteen men arrived at Sainte-Anne des Pays-Bas. The Rangers pillaged and burned the village of 147 buildings, two Mass-houses, besides all the barns and stables. The Rangers burned a large store-house, and with a large quantity of hay, wheat, peas, oats, etc., killing 212 horses, about 5 head of cattle, a large number of hogs and so forth. They also burned the church (located just west of Old Government House, Fredericton).

As well, the rangers tortured and scalped six Acadians and took six prisoners. There is a written record of one of the Acadian survivors Joseph Godin-Bellefontaine. He reported that the Rangers restrained him and then massacred his family in front of him. There are other primary sources that support his assertions.

 Gulf of St. Lawrence Campaign 

In the Gulf of St. Lawrence Campaign (also known as the Gaspee Expedition), British forces raided French villages along present-day New Brunswick and the Gaspé Peninsula coast of the Gulf of Saint Lawrence. Sir Charles Hardy and Brigadier-General James Wolfe commanded the naval and military forces, respectively. After the Siege of Louisbourg (1758), Wolfe and Hardy led a force of 1500 troops in nine vessels to the Gaspé Bay arriving there on September 5. From there they dispatched troops to Miramichi Bay (Sept. 12), Grande-Rivière, Quebec and Pabos (Sept. 13), and Mont-Louis, Quebec (Sept. 14). Over the following weeks, Sir Charles Hardy took four sloops or schooners, destroyed about 200 fishing vessels, and took about 200 prisoners.

 Restigouche 
The Acadians took refuge along the Baie des Chaleurs and the Restigouche River. Boishébert had a refugee camp at Petit-Rochelle (which was located perhaps near present-day Pointe-à-la-Croix, Quebec). The year after the Battle of Restigouche, in late 1761, Captain Roderick Mackenzie and his force captured over 330 Acadians at Boishebert's camp.

 Halifax 

During this time period, Halifax continued to be fortified by the Northwest Arm Battery (1761) and the Point Pleasant Battery (1763), both located in present-day Point Pleasant Park.  After the French conquered St. John's, Newfoundland in June 1762, the success galvanized both the Acadians and Natives. They began gathering in large numbers at various points throughout the province and behaving in a confident and, according to the British,"insolent fashion". Officials were especially alarmed when Natives concentrated close to the two principal towns in the province, Halifax and Lunenburg, where there were also large groups of Acadians. The government organized an expulsion of 1300 people, shipping them to Boston. The government of Massachusetts refused the Acadians permission to land and sent them back to Halifax.

Before the deportation, Acadian population was estimated at 14,000 Acadians. Most were deported. Some Acadians escaped to Quebec, or hid among the Mi'kmaq or in the countryside, to avoid deportation until the situation settled down.

The war ended and Britain had gained control over the entire Maritime region.

 Acadian, Maliseet and Mi’kmaq resistance 

During the expulsion, French Officer Charles Deschamps de Boishébert led the Mi'kmaq and the Acadians in a guerrilla war against the British.  According to Louisbourg account books, by late 1756, the French had regularly dispensed supplies to 700 Natives. From 1756 to the fall of Louisbourg in 1758, the French made regular payments to Chief Jean-Baptiste Cope and other natives for British scalps.

 Annapolis (Fort Anne) 

The Acadians and Mi’kmaq fought in the Annapolis region. They were victorious in the Battle of Bloody Creek (1757). Acadians being deported from Annapolis Royal, Nova Scotia, on the ship Pembroke rebelled against the British crew, took over the ship and sailed to land.

In December 1757, while cutting firewood near Fort Anne, John Weatherspoon was captured by Indians (presumably Mi'kmaq) and carried away to the mouth of the Miramichi River. From there he was eventually sold or traded to the French and taken to Quebec, where he was held until late in 1759 and the Battle of the Plains of Abraham, when General Wolfe's forces prevailed (See Journal of John Witherspoon, Annapolis Royal)
.

About 50 or 60 Acadians who escaped the initial deportation are reported to have made their way to the Cape Sable region (which included south western Nova Scotia). From there, they participated in numerous raids on Lunenburg, Nova Scotia.

 Piziquid (Fort Edward) 
In the April 1757, a band of Acadian and Mi'kmaq raided a warehouse near Fort Edward, killing thirteen British soldiers. After loading with what provisions they could carry, they set fire to the building.  A few days later, the same partisans also raided Fort Cumberland.  Because of the strength of the Acadian militia and Mi'kmaq militia, British officer John Knox wrote that "In the year 1757 we were said to be Masters of the province of Nova Scotia, or Acadia, which, however, was only an imaginary possession."  He continues to state that the situation in the province was so precarious for the British that the "troops and inhabitants" at Fort Edward, Fort Sackville and Lunenburg "could not be reputed in any other light than as prisoners."

 Chignecto (Fort Cumberland) 

The Acadians and Mi’kmaq also resisted in the Chignecto region. They were victorious in the Battle of Petitcodiac (1755). In the spring of 1756, a wood-gathering party from Fort Monckton (former Fort Gaspareaux), was ambushed and nine were scalped. In the April 1757, after raiding Fort Edward, the same band of Acadian and Mi'kmaq partisans raided Fort Cumberland, killing and scalping two men and taking two prisoners. July 20, 1757 Mi'kmaq killed 23 and captured two of Gorham's rangers outside Fort Cumberland near present-day Jolicure, New Brunswick. In March 1758, forty Acadian and Mi'kmaq attacked a schooner at Fort Cumberland and killed its master and two sailors. In the winter of 1759, the Mi'kmaq ambushed five British soldiers on patrol while they were crossing a bridge near Fort Cumberland. They were ritually scalped and their bodies mutilated as was common in the savage warfare of the Indians. During the night of 4 April 1759, using canoes, a force of Acadians and French captured the transport. At dawn they attacked the ship Moncton and chased it for five hours down the Bay of Fundy. Although the Moncton escaped, its crew suffered one killed and two wounded.

Others resisted during the St. John River Campaign and the Petitcodiac River Campaign.

 Lawrencetown 

By June 1757, the settlers had to be withdrawn completely from the settlement of Lawrencetown (established 1754) because the number of Indian raids eventually prevented settlers from leaving their houses.

In nearby Dartmouth, Nova Scotia, in the spring of 1759, there was another Mi'kmaq attack on Eastern Battery, in which five soldiers were killed.

 Maine 

In present-day Maine, the Mi’kmaq and the Maliseet raided numerous New England villages. At the end of April 1755, they raided Gorham, Maine, killing two men and a family. Next they appeared in New-Boston (Gray) and through the neighbouring towns destroying the plantations. On May 13, they raided Frankfort (Dresden), where two men were killed and a house burned. The same day they raided Sheepscot (Newcastle), and took five prisoners. Two were killed in North Yarmouth on May 29 and one taken captive. They shot one person at Teconnet. They took prisoners at Fort Halifax; two prisoners taken at Fort Shirley (Dresden). They took two captive at New Gloucester as they worked on the local fort. During the Seven Years' War, on June 9, 1758, Indians raided the Woolwich, Maine, killing members of the Preble family and taking others prisoner to Quebec. This incident became known as the last conflict on the Kennebec River.

On 13 August 1758 Boishebert left Miramichi, New Brunswick with 400 soldiers, including Acadians which he led from Port Toulouse. They marched to Fort St George (Thomaston, Maine) and Munduncook (Friendship, Maine). While the former siege was unsuccessful, in the latter raid on Munduncook, they wounded eight British settlers and killed others. This was Boishébert's last Acadian expedition. From there, Boishebert and the Acadians went to Quebec and fought in the Battle of Quebec (1759).

 Lunenburg 

The Acadians and Mi'kmaq raided the Lunenburg settlement nine times over a three-year period during the war. Boishebert ordered the first Raid on Lunenburg (1756). Following the raid of 1756, in 1757, there was a raid on Lunenburg in which six people from the Brissang family were killed. The following year, March 1758, there was a raid on the Lunenburg Peninsula at the Northwest Range (present-day Blockhouse, Nova Scotia) when five people were killed from the Ochs and Roder families. By the end of May 1758, most of those on the Lunenburg Peninsula abandoned their farms and retreated to the protection of the fortifications around the town of Lunenburg, losing the season for sowing their grain. For those that did not leave their farms for the town, the number of raids intensified.

During the summer of 1758, there were four raids on the Lunenburg Peninsula. On 13 July 1758, one person on the LaHave River at Dayspring was killed and another seriously wounded by a member of the Labrador family. The next raid happened at Mahone Bay, Nova Scotia, on 24 August 1758, when eight Mi'kmaq attacked the family homes of Lay and Brant. While they killed three people in the raid, the Mi'kmaq were unsuccessful in taking their scalps, which was the common practice for payment from the French. Two days, later, two soldiers were killed in a raid on the blockhouse at LaHave, Nova Scotia. Almost two weeks later, on 11 September, a child was killed in a raid on the Northwest Range. Another raid happened on 27 March 1759, in which three members of the Oxner family were killed. The last raid happened on 20 April 1759. The Mi’kmaq killed four settlers at Lunenburg who were members of the Trippeau and Crighton families.

 Halifax 
On 2 April 1756, Mi'kmaq received payment from the Governor of Quebec for 12 British scalps taken at Halifax. Acadian Pierre Gautier, son of Joseph-Nicolas Gautier, led Mi’kmaq warriors from Louisbourg on three raids against Halifax in 1757. In each raid, Gautier took prisoners or scalps or both. The last raid happened in September and Gautier went with four Mi’kmaq and killed and scalped two British men at the foot of Citadel Hill. (Pierre went on to participate in the Battle of Restigouche.) 

In July 1759, Mi'kmaq and Acadians kill five Britons in Dartmouth, opposite McNabb's Island.

 Halifax Treaties 
After agreeing to several peace treaties, the seventy-five year period of war ended with the Halifax Treaties between the British and the Mi'kmaq (1761). (In commemoration of these treaties, Nova Scotians annually celebrate Treaty Day on October 1.) To enforce the treaties, the British continued to build fortifications in the province (see Fort Ellis and Fort Belcher). Despite the treaties being clear about Mi'kmaq "submission" to the British, their agreeing to become British subjects, give up robbery and murder, and follow the rule of law, there some contemporary historians who claim the treaties did not indicate the Mi'kmaq surrendered to the British. In the event, there was no further trouble of note from this tribe.

 Headquarters of the North American Station 

Halifax was the headquarters for the Royal Navy's North American Station for sixty years (1758–1818). Halifax Harbour had served as a Royal Navy seasonal base from the founding of the city in 1749, using temporary facilities and a careening beach on Georges Island. Land and buildings for a permanent Naval Yard were purchased in 1758 and the Yard was officially commissioned in 1759. Land and buildings for a permanent Naval Yard were purchased by the Royal Naval Dockyard, Halifax in 1758 and the Yard was officially commissioned in 1759. The Yard served as the main base for the British Royal Navy in North American during the Seven Years' War, the American Revolution, the French Revolutionary Wars and the War of 1812. In 1818 Halifax became the summer base for the squadron which shifted to the Royal Naval Dockyard, Bermuda for the remainder of the year. One of the most famous commanders of the station was Robert Digby (1781–1783). After the surrender of New York city in 1783, Digby helped to organise the evacuation of some 1,500 United Empire Loyalists to the small port of Conway in Nova Scotia. The settlement he led transformed the tiny village into a town, which in 1787 was renamed Digby, Nova Scotia.

American Revolution 

At the outbreak of the outbreak of the American Revolution, many Nova Scotians were New England-born and were sympathetic to the American Patriots. This support somewhat eroded over the first two years of the war as American Privateers attacked Nova Scotian villages and shipping to try to interrupt Nova Scotian trade with the American Loyalists still in New England who were opposing the Revolution.  During the war, American Privateers captured 225 vessels either leaving or arriving at Nova Scotia ports.

Nineteenth century

French Revolutionary Wars 

Halifax was now the bastion of British strength on the East Coast of North America. Local merchants also took advantage of the exclusion of American trade to the British colonies in the Caribbean, beginning a long trade relationship with the West Indies. However, the most significant growth began with the beginning of the French Revolutionary Wars. Military spending and the opportunities of wartime shipping and trading stimulated growth led by local merchants such as Simeon Perkins, Charles Ramage Prescott and Enos Collins.  The most renown privateer was Captain Alexander Godfrey of the Rover from Liverpool, Nova Scotia.

Conquest of Saint Pierre and Miquelon 

While in Halifax, the ships were outfitted and Ogilvie impressed the citizens of Halifax to join him on the expedition. There were 310 troops primarily from the 4th Regiment of Foot. They captured Saint Pierre on 14 May without firing a shot. They also captured 18 small vessels carrying fish, and two American schooners with provisions and naval stores.  joined them a day later and then sailed to Miquelon to complete the conquest. Prize money for the capture of the islands was paid in October 1796. They captured the Prefect of Saint Pierre and Miquelon, Antoine-Nicolas Dandasne-Danseville, and several hundred prisoners who were all brought to Halifax. Dandasne-Danseville remained a prisoner in Halifax until 1814. He married a woman from Dartmouth and had children. Nova Scotia Governor John Wentworth rented Kavanagh's Island (aka Melville Island) to house 600 French prisoners that had been captured on St. Pierre and Miquelon. The commander of the Halifax garrison, Brigadier General James Ogilvie, objected to the plan, and instead housed the prisoners at Cornwallis Barracks in Halifax. Several prisoners were able to escape from the makeshift prison, and the rest were sent to Guernsey in June 1794.

Prince Edward arrives 
By 1796, Prince Edward, Duke of Kent, was sent to take command of Nova Scotia. Many of the city's forts were designed by him, and he left an indelible mark on the city in the form of many public buildings of Georgian architecture, and a dignified British feel to the city itself. It was during this time that Halifax truly became a city. Many landmarks and institutions were built during his tenure, from the Town Clock on Citadel Hill to St. George's Round Church, fortifications in the Halifax Defence Complex were built up, businesses established, and the population boomed.

Napoleonic Wars

Trafalgar Day 

During the Napoleonic Wars, Trafalgar Day was celebrated in Nova Scotia and across the Commonwealth on October 21 throughout the 19th century until the end of World War I. The day commemorated Horatio Nelson’s victory over Napoleon in 1805, which has been called "the most famous naval battle in history and the most decisive engagement of the Napoleonic Wars, Trafalgar cemented Britain’s supremacy on the high seas."  Nova Scotians also fought at Trafalgar: John Houlton Marshall, George Augustus Westphal, Phillip Westphal. In 1905, the battles centenary, there was two days of festivities in Halifax. Flags were flown at half-mast and the Halifax Herald stated that October 21 was arguably the "most memorable day in all British history". In 1927, the Canadian Pacific Railway built the Lord Nelson Hotel. The bi-centennial was also marked by recognition in various museums in the province.

Halifax Impressment Riot 

The towns people and especially seafarers were constantly on-guard of the press gangs of the Royal Navy.

The Navy's manning problems in Nova Scotia peaked in 1805. Warships were short-handed from high desertion rates, and naval captains were handicapped in filling those vacancies by provincial impressment regulations. Desperate for sailors, the Navy pressed them all over the North Atlantic region in 1805, from Halifax and Charlottetown to Saint John and Quebec City. In early May, Vice Admiral Andrew Mitchell sent press gangs from several warships into downtown Halifax. They conscripted men first and asked questions later, rounding up dozens of potential recruits.

Wentworth lashed out at the admiral for sparking urban unrest and breaking provincial impressment laws, and his government exploited this violent episode to put even tighter restrictions of recruiting in Nova Scotia.

Stemming from impressment disturbances, civil-naval relations deteriorated in Nova Scotia from 1805 to the War of 1812.  was in Liverpool for only about a week, but it terrified the small town the entire time and naval impressment remained a serious threat to sailors along the South Shore. After leaving Liverpool, Whiting terrorized Shelburne by pressing inhabitants, breaking into homes, and forcing more than a dozen families to live in the forest to avoid further harassment.

Invasion of Martinique (1809) 

Lt Governor of Nova Scotia George Prévost mobilized the British Navy in Halifax for the Invasion of Martinique (1809) (after which Martinique, Nova Scotia and Martinique Beach are named). In an effort to appease House of Assembly leader William Cottnam Tonge, Prévost appointed him to be his second-in-command. They departed from Halifax on 6 December 1808. Martinique was captured, and Prévost returned to Halifax on 15 April 1809 and the town gave a ball at Mason Hall to commemorate the victory. On 10 June 1808, the House of Assembly passed the supply bill, and also voted to use 200 guineas to purchase a sword for Prévost as a sign of their approval for Prévost's conduct during the expedition against Martinique.  Three soldiers died in the invasion, all from the Royal Welch Fusiliers and are commemorated with a plaque in St. George's (Round) Church, Halifax, Nova Scotia. Prévost believed he had successfully maintained the crown's prerogative at Martinique and was celebrated upon his return to Nova Scotia. Prévost had become a popular lieutenant governor.

War of 1812 

In the lead-up to the War of 1812, the Little Belt affair created excitement in Nova Scotia. Having departed Annapolis Royal, on May 27, 1811, the British vessel Little Belt arrived in Halifax with many of the crew killed or wounded after having been attacked by an American vessel. At the outset of the war, Nova Scotia was again alarmed when  was off the coast and defeated HMS Guerriere, which had just departed from Halifax.  (A month earlier  had arrived in port having escaped an attack.)

During the War of 1812, Nova Scotia's contribution to the war effort was communities either purchasing or building various privateer ships to seize American vessels. Three members of the community of Lunenburg, Nova Scotia purchased a privateer schooner and named it Lunenburg on August 8, 1814.  The Nova Scotian privateer vessel captured seven American vessels. Liverpool Packet from Liverpool, Nova Scotia, was another Nova Scotia privateer vessel that caught over fifty ships in the war – the most of any privateer in Canada.  was also very successful during the war, being the largest privateer on the Atlantic coast. (See Historic Properties (Halifax))

Perhaps the most dramatic moment in the war for Nova Scotia was when  led the captured American frigate USS Chesapeake into Halifax Harbour (1813). The captain of Shannon was injured and Nova Scotian Provo Wallis took command of the ship to escort Chesapeake to Halifax. Many of the prisoners were kept at Deadman's Island, Halifax. After 20 minutes of savage fighting, the British surrendered. British casualties amounted to 28 killed, 37 wounded, and 28 taken prisoner. The Americans reported losing 7 men killed and 24 wounded.

On September 3, 1814, a British fleet from Halifax, Nova Scotia, began to lay siege to Maine to re-establish British title to Maine east of the Penobscot River, an area the British had renamed "New Ireland". Carving off "New Ireland" from New England had been a goal of the British government and settlers of Nova Scotia ("New Scotland") since the American Revolution. The British expedition involved 8 war-ships and 10 transports (carrying 3,500 British regulars) that were under the overall command of Sir John Coape Sherbrooke, then Lt. Gov. of Nova Scotia. On July 3, 1814, the expedition captured the coastal town of Castine, Maine and then went on to raid Belfast, Machias, Eastport, Hampden and Bangor (See Battle of Hampden). After the war, Maine was returned to America through the Treaty of Ghent. The brief life of the colony yielded customs revenues, called the "Castine Fund", which were subsequently used to finance a military library in Halifax and found Dalhousie College.  Dalhousie University has a street named "Castine Way".

The most famous soldier that was buried in Nova Scotia during the war was Robert Ross (British Army officer). Ross was responsible for the Burning of Washington, including the White House. (Other famous Nova Scotians who served in the war are:George Edward Watts, Sir George Augustus Westphal, Sir Edward Belcher, and Philip Westphal, all of whom are commemorated by the Historic Sites and Monuments Board of Canada plaques at Stadacona, CFB Halifax.)

Crimean War 

Nova Scotians fought in the Crimean War. The Sebastopol Monument in Halifax is the fourth  oldest war monument in Canada and the only Crimean War monument in North America. Another Nova Scotian soldier who fought with distinction during the Crimean war was Sir William Williams, 1st Baronet, of Kars (after whom Port Williams, Nova Scotia and Karsdale, Nova Scotia are named).

In the wake of the Crimean War, the second black military unit in Canada (one of the first in Nova Scotia) was formed, Victoria Rifles (Nova Scotia) (1860).

One resident of Halifax named his home Alma Villa after the Battle of Alma.

Indian Mutiny 

Nova Scotians also participated in the Indian Mutiny in 1857 to 1858. Two of the most famous were William Hall (VC) and Sir John Eardley Inglis (namesake of Inglis Street, Halifax), both of whom participated in the Siege of Lucknow (namesake of Lucknow St., Halifax). (The community Havelock, Nova Scotia is named after a hero of the mutiny.) The 78th (Highlanders) Regiment of Foot were famous for their involvement with the siege and were later posted to Citadel Hill (Fort George).

American Civil War 
Over 200 Nova Scotians have been identified as fighting in the American Civil War (1861–1865). Most joined Maine or Massachusetts infantry regiments, but one in ten served the Confederacy (South). The total probably reached into two thousand as many young men had migrated to the U.S. before 1860. Pacifism, neutrality, anti-Americanism, and anti-Yankee sentiments all operated to keep the numbers down, but on the other hand, abolitionist sentiment ran high and there were strong cash incentives besides to join the Federal army. The long tradition of emigrating out of Nova Scotia combined with a zest for adventure also attracted many young men. The most well known Nova Scotians to fight in the war effort are Charles Robinson (Medal of Honor), Joseph B. Noil, Robert Knox Sneden, Benjamin Jackson and John Taylor Wood, the latter becoming a naturalized citizen after the war. Three Black Nova Scotians served in the famous 54th Regiment Massachusetts Volunteer Infantry, Hammel Gilyer, Samuel Hazzard, and Thomas Page.

The British Empire (including Nova Scotia) declared neutrality, and Nova Scotia prospered greatly from trade with the North. There were no attempts to trade with the South.

The war left many fearful that the North might attempt to annex British North America, particularly after the Fenian raids began. In response, volunteer regiments were raised across Nova Scotia. British commander and Lt Governor of Nova Scotia Charles Hastings Doyle (after whom Port Hastings is named) led 700 troops out of Halifax to crush a Fenian attack on the New Brunswick border with Maine. This rather baseless scare was one of the main reasons why Britain sanctioned the creation of Canada (1867); to avoid another possible conflict with America and to leave the defence of Nova Scotia to a Canadian Government.

North-West Rebellion 

The Halifax Provisional Battalion was a military unit from Nova Scotia, which was sent to fight in the North-West Rebellion in 1885. The battalion was under command of Lieut.-Colonel James J. Bremner and consisted of 168 non-commissioned officers and men of The Princess Louise Fusiliers, 100 of the 63rd Battalion Rifles, and 84 of the Halifax Garrison Artillery, with 32 officers. The battalion left Halifax under orders for the North-West on Saturday, April 11, 1885, and they stayed for almost three months.

Prior to Nova Scotia's involvement, the province remained hostile to Canada in the aftermath of how the colony was forced into Canada. The celebration that followed the Halifax Provisional Battalion's return by train across the county ignited a national patriotism in Nova Scotia. Prime Minister Robert Borden stated that "up to this time Nova Scotia hardly regarded itself as included in the Canadian Confederation.... The rebellion evoked a new spirit.... The Riel Rebellion did more to unite Nova Scotia with the rest of Canada than any event that had occurred since Confederation."  Similarly, in 1907 Governor General Earl Grey declared, "This Battalion... went out Nova Scotians, they returned Canadians." The wrought iron gates at the Halifax Public Gardens were made in the Battalion's honour.

Twentieth century

Second Boer War 

During the Second Boer War (1899–1902), the First Contingent was composed of seven Companies from across Canada. The Nova Scotia Company (H) consisted of 125 men. (The total First Contingent was a total force of 1,019. Eventually over 8600 Canadians served.) The mobilization of the Contingent took place at Quebec. On October 30, 1899, the ship Sardinian sailed the troops for four weeks to Cape Town.
The Boer War marked the first occasion in which large contingents of Nova Scotian troops served abroad (individual Nova Scotians had served in the Crimean War).
The Battle of Paardeberg in February 1900 represented the second time Canadian soldiers saw battle abroad (the first being the Canadian involvement in the Nile Expedition). Canadians also saw action at the Battle of Faber's Put on May 30, 1900. On November 7, 1900, the Royal Canadian Dragoons engaged the Boers in the Battle of Leliefontein, where they saved British guns from capture during a retreat from the banks of the Komati River.
Approximately 267 Canadians died in the War. 89 men were killed in action, 135 died of disease, and the remainder died of accident or injury. 252 were wounded.

Of all the Canadians who died during the war, the most famous was the young Lt. Harold Lothrop Borden of Canning, Nova Scotia. Harold Borden's father was Sir Frederick W. Borden, Canada's Minister of Militia who was a strong proponent of Canadian participation in the war. Another famous Nova Scotian casualty of the war was Charles Carroll Wood (after whom Chaswood, Nova Scotia is named), son of the renowned Confederate naval captain John Taylor Wood and the first Canadian to die in the war.

For two decades afterwards, Canadians would gather on February 27 (known in Canada as "Paardeberg Day") around memorials to the South African War to say prayers and honour veterans. This continued until the end of the First World War, when Armistice Day (later called Remembrance Day) began to be observed on November 11.

First World War 

The prime minister of Canada during the war was Nova Scotian Robert Borden. For the war effort 39 units were raised in Nova Scotia, made up of 30,000 soldiers (the total population of Nova Scotia being 550,000).

During World War I, Halifax became a major international port and naval facility. The harbour became a major shipment point for war supplies, troop ships to Europe from Canada and the United States and hospital ships returning the wounded. These factors drove a major military, industrial and residential expansion of the city.

On 27 June 1917, a German U-boat torpedoed a hospital ship from the port of Halifax named . Escaping lifeboats were pursued and sunk by the U-boat and the survivors machine-gunned. Of the crew totalling 258, only twenty-four survived. The commander of the ship, Lt.-Col. Thomas Howard MacDonald, was from Nova Scotia as was the nursing Matron, Margaret Marjory Fraser (daughter of Lt. Governor of Nova Scotia Duncan Cameron Fraser). Lt.-Col MacDonald died as did Fraser along with the 13 nurses under her command.

On Thursday, December 6, 1917, the city of Halifax, Nova Scotia, Canada, was devastated by the huge detonation of a French cargo ship, fully loaded with wartime explosives, that had accidentally collided with a Norwegian ship in "The Narrows" section of the Halifax Harbour. Approximately 2,000 people (mostly Canadians) were killed by debris, fires, or collapsed buildings, and it is estimated that over 9,000 people were injured. This is still the world's largest man-made accidental explosion.

Founders of the League of Nations included David Ben-Gurion, who became the first prime minister of Israel, and Ze'ev Jabotinsky; both men were trained at Fort Edward. At age 70, David Ben-Gurion reported on his time at Fort Edward: "I will never forget Windsor where I received my first training as a soldier and where I became a corporal."

The Amherst Internment Camp was one of three internment camps in the province. It existed from 1914 to 1919 in Amherst, Nova Scotia. It was the largest POW camp in Canada during World War I; a maximum of 853 prisoners were housed at one time at the old Malleable Iron foundry on the corner of Hickman and Park Streets. The most famous prisoner of war at the camp was Leon Trotsky.

Three Nova Scotian battalions saw combat in Europe as distinct fighting units – The Royal Canadian Regiment, 85th Battalion and 25th Battalion. The Royal Canadian Regiment, based in Halifax, was the only unit in existence at the time of the war's outbreak.

The 36th Battery, Canadian Field Artillery, was raised out of Sydney, Cape Breton in September 1915 by Major Walter Crowe, a prominent lawyer and former mayor of Sydney.

The No. 2 Construction Battalion, Canadian Expeditionary Force (CEF), was the only predominantly black battalion in Canadian military history and also the only Canadian Battalion composed of black soldiers to serve in World War I. The battalion was raised in Nova Scotia. 56% of the battalion was from Nova Scotia (500 soldiers). (An earlier black military unit in Nova Scotia was the Victoria Rifles (Nova Scotia).)

Spanish Civil War 

The Communist Party of Canada (which included Dr. Norman Bethune) had a significant recruitment effort in Nova Scotia for the Mackenzie-Papineau Battalion to fight against the rebel Nationalists (which they presented as ‘fascist’) in the Spanish Civil War. Joining the Battalion was illegal under Canadian law. Despite this, there were 31 volunteers from the Maritimes, 19 from Nova Scotia. (1500 volunteers were recruited across the country and half of them were killed in the defeat.)  Perhaps the best known Nova Scotian in the war was rhodes scholar and Dalhousie University professor Roy Leitch who settled in Spryfield, Nova Scotia after the war. He later published the controversial newspaper "The Storm". From 3–18, February 1939, 421 returning soldiers of the Battalion disembarked at Halifax.  The last Nova Scotian veteran of the "Mac-Paps" died in the 1980s. The Canadian Government has always denied official recognition of these veterans.

Second World War 

During World War II, thousands of Nova Scotians went overseas. One Nova Scotian, Mona Louise Parsons, joined the Dutch resistance and was eventually captured and imprisoned by the Nazis for almost four years. Another Nova Scotian, William M. Jones was part of the resistance movement in Yugoslavia.

From the start of the war in 1939 until VE Day, several of Canada's Atlantic coast ports became important to the resupply effort for the United Kingdom and later for the Allied land offensive on the Western Front. Halifax and Sydney, Nova Scotia became the primary convoy assembly ports, with Halifax being assigned the fast or priority convoys (largely troops and essential material) with the more modern merchant ships, while Sydney was given slow convoys which conveyed bulkier material on older and more vulnerable merchant ships. The Halifax convoys were coded HX- (e.g., Convoy HX 84), and absorbed the BHX- coded convoys from Bermuda before crossing the Atlantic. Both ports were heavily fortified with shore radar emplacements, search light batteries, and extensive coastal artillery stations all manned by RCN and Canadian Army regular and reserve personnel. Military intelligence agents enforced strict blackouts throughout the areas and anti-torpedo nets were in place at the harbor entrances. Despite the fact that no landings of German personnel took place near these ports, there were frequent attacks by U-boats on convoys departing for Europe. Less extensively used, but no less important, was the port of Saint John which also saw matériel funneled through the port, largely after the United States entered the war in December 1941. The Canadian Pacific Railway mainline from central Canada (which crossed the state of Maine) could be used to transport in aid of the war effort.

Although not crippling to the Canadian war effort, given the country's rail network to the east coast ports, but possibly more destructive to the morale of the Canadian public, was the Battle of the St. Lawrence, when U-boats began to attack domestic coastal shipping along Canada's east coast in the St. Lawrence River and Gulf of St. Lawrence from early 1942 through to the end of the shipping season in late 1944.

 was a Newfoundland Railway passenger ferry that ran between Port aux Basques, in the Dominion of Newfoundland, and North Sydney, Nova Scotia between 1928 and 1942. As a civilian vessel, it had women and children on board, and many of them were among the 137 who died. Its sinking, and large death toll, made it clear that the war had really arrived on Canada's and Newfoundland's home front, and is cited by many historians as the most significant sinking in Canadian-controlled waters during the Second World War. In the Cabot Strait, just off Cape Breton, on 25 November 1944  was torpedoed and sunk with all hands on board (85 crew) by U-1228.

In World War I and World War II, German submarines torpedoed a number of allied ships near Sambro Island Light. She sank quickly and eight people died. A large search force was sent out to deal with the U-boat however they were not successful in finding it. In the early morning of 16 April 1945, just off Halifax harbour,  sunk , killing 44 crew.

Royal Canadian Air Force (RCAF) aircraft carried out operational patrols from RCAF stations such as Charlottetown, Summerside, Debert, Stanley and Sydney as well as various civilian fields, particularly in the Magdalen Islands.

At Camp Hill Cemetery there are 17 graves of Norwegian sailors, soldiers and merchant seamen who died in Nova Scotia during World War II. These men were at sea when Germany invaded Norway in 1940. The King and government of Norway ordered the more than 1,000 ships at sea to go to Allied ports. Camp Norway was established at Lunenburg.

Leonard W. Murray was born at Granton, Nova Scotia on 22 June 1896. Rear Admiral Murray, CB, CBE was an officer of the Royal Canadian Navy who played a significant role in the Battle of the Atlantic. He commanded the Newfoundland Escort Force from 1941 to 1943, and from 1943 to the end of the war was Commander-in-Chief, Canadian Northwest Atlantic. He was the only Canadian to command an Allied theatre of operations during World War I or World War II. He resigned his command early as a result of the Halifax VE-Day Riot.

In May 1945, following Germany's surrender,  surrendered to the RCN at Shelburne, Nova Scotia.

Korean War 

During the Korean War there were 48 Nova Scotians who died in the war and more than 100 were wounded. (See Atlantic Canada Korean War Monument and Cape Breton Korean War Monument). The only Nova Scotian who was a member of the Royal Canadian Navy to die was Robert John Moore. He was killed while in an air crash.

Afghanistan 
There were 13 Nova Scotians among the 158 Canadians killed in the Afghanistan War.

Notable Nova Scotian military figures 

The following list includes those who were born in Nova Scotia, Acadia and Mi'kma'ki or those who became naturalized citizens. Those who came for brief periods from other countries are not included (e.g. John Gorham, Edward Cornwallis, James Wolfe, Boishébert, Thomas Pichon, etc.)

17th-18th centuries 

 Charles de Saint-Étienne de la Tour – Acadian Civil War
 Chief Madockawando – King William's War
 John Gyles – King William's War
 Father Louis-Pierre Thury – King William's War
 Pierre Maisonnat dit Baptiste – Queen Anne's War
 Robert Denison – King George's War
 Joseph-Nicolas Gautier – Father Le Loutre's War
 Pierre II Surette – Seven Years' War
 John Allan (colonel) – American Revolution
 Benjamin Belcher – American Revolution

19th century

20th century 

 William M. Jones
 Ransford D. Bucknam
 Edward Francis Arab

Nova Scotian Victoria Cross Recipients

Communities and streets named after military leaders and battles

King Georges War 
 Shirley St., Halifax, William Shirley
 Pepperell St., Halifax William Pepperell
 Mascarene Ave., Halifax, Paul Mascarene

Father Le Loutre's War 
 Port Hawkesbury, Edward Hawke, 1st Baron Hawke
 Morris St., Halifax, Charles Morris (jurist)
 Lawrencetown, Nova Scotia, Charles Lawrence
 Cornwallis, Nova Scotia, Edward Cornwallis
 Cornwalliis St., Halifax, Edward Cornwallis

Seven Years' War 
Amherst, Nova Scotia, Jeffery Amherst
 Cumberland County, Nova Scotia, Prince William, Duke of Cumberland
 Montague St., Lunenburg, Nova Scotia, Montague Wilmot

American Revolution 
 Belcher Street, Port Williams, Nova Scotia, Lieut. Benjamin Belcher, hero of Battle of Blomindon
 Guysborough, Nova Scotia (Guy's borough), Guy Carleton, 1st Baron Dorchester
 Carleton Corner
 Carleton Village, Nova Scotia
 Birchtown, Nova Scotia, Brigadier-General Samuel Birch, compiler of the Book of Negroes 
 Rawdon, Nova Scotia, Francis Rawdon-Hastings
Digby, Nova Scotia, Admiral Robert Digby (Royal Navy officer)
 Abercrombie, Nova Scotia, General James Abercrombie
 Tiddville, Nova Scotia, Samuel Tidd, a private for Col. Beverley Robinson
 Gilbert Cove, Nova Scotia, Lt. Thomas Gilbert
 Barton, Nova Scotia, Lt. Col. Joseph Barton (military officer)
 Russell Lake, Nova Scotia, Nathaniel Russell
 Parrsboro, Nova Scotia, John Parr
 Wentworth, Nova Scotia, Sir John Wentworth, 1st Baronet
 Wentworth Valley, Nova Scotia
 Wentworth Station, Nova Scotia
Douglas, Nova Scotia, Sir Charles Douglas, 1st Baronet

Napoleonic Wars 
Port Hood, Nova Scotia
 Westphal, Nova Scotia, George Augustus Westphal
 Castine Way, Dalhousie University, Halifax, Battle of Hampden
 Provo Wallis St., Halifax Dockyard, Provo Wallis 
Martinique, Nova Scotia, Invasion of Martinique (1809)
Waterloo St. Halifax, Battle of Waterloo
 Wellington, St., Halifax, Arthur Wellesley, 1st Duke of Wellington
 Sherbrooke, Nova Scotia, John Coape Sherbrooke
Admiral Rock, Nova Scotia, Admiral Alexander Cochrane
Lake Ainslie, Ainslieview, Nova Scotia and Ainslie Point, Nova Scotia, George Robert Ainslie
 Kempt Shore, Nova Scotia, James Kempt
 Kempt Road, Nova Scotia
 Kempt Road, Halifax, Nova Scotia
 Kempt Street, Lunenburg

Crimean War 
 Lucknow St., Halifax, Siege of Lucknow
 Inglis St., Halifax, John Eardley Inglis
 Havelock, Nova Scotia, Henry Havelock
 Karsdale, Nova Scotia, Sir William Williams, 1st Baronet, of Kars 
 Port Williams, Nova Scotia, Sir William Williams, 1st Baronet, of Kars 
 Parker St., Halifax, Sebastopol Monument
 Welsford St., Halifax, Sebastopol Monument
 Welsford St., Pictou, Nova Scotia
 Alma, Nova Scotia, Battle of Alma

American Civil War 
 Ben Jackson Road (exit 8A Highway 101), Benjamin Jackson (soldier)
 Port Hastings, Nova Scotia, Charles Hastings Doyle

Boer War

See also 
Halifax Treaties
 The Nova Scotia Highlanders
 Naval Museum of Halifax
 Halifax Armoury
 CFB Greenwood
 CFB Halifax
 History of Nova Scotia
 History of New Brunswick
 History of the Halifax Regional Municipality
 Royal Nova Scotia Historical Society
 Military history of the Mi’kmaq people
 Military history of the Acadians
Military history of Canada

References

Bibliography 

  The Wars on the Seaboard: The Struggle in Acadia and Cape Breton
 Nova Scotia - militia law
 Akins. Provincial Defenses
 
 Doughty, Arthur G. (1916). The Acadian Exiles. A Chronicle of the Land of Evangeline, Toronto: Glasgow, Brook & Co. 178 pages
 Douglas, W. A. B. The Sea Militia of Nova Scotia, 1749–1755: A Comment on Naval Policy. The Canadian Historical Review. Vol. XLVII, No.1. 1966. 22-37
 
 Eaton, A. W. H. Halifax Defenses. In: Chapters in the history of Halifax, Nova Scotia (1915).
 Faragher, John Mack (2005).  A Great and Noble Scheme: The Tragic Story of the Expulsion of the French Acadians from their American Homeland, New York: W.W. Norton, 562 pages 
 Grenier, John. The Far Reaches of Empire. War in Nova Scotia, 1710–1760. Norman: U of Oklahoma P, 2008. pp. 154–155
 John Grenier. The Far Reaches of Empire: War in Nova Scotia, 1710-1760. Oklahoma University Press. 2008 
 
 
 Michael L. Hadley. U-Boats Against Canada: German Submarines in Canadian Waters
 Hunt, M.S. Nova Scotia's Part in the Great War The Nova Scotia Veteran Publishing Company Limited. 1920
 Johnston, John. The Acadian Deportation in a Comparative Context: An Introduction. Royal Nova Scotia Historical Society: The Journal. 2007. pp. 114–131
 Kidder, F. MILITARY OPERATIONS IN EASTERN MAINE AND NOVA SCOTIA DURING THE REVOLUTION. (1867)
 Landry, Peter. The Lion & The Lily. Vol. 1. Victoria: Trafford, 2007.
 
 Simon MacDonald. Ships of war lost on the coast of Nova Scotia and Sable Island during the eighteenth century (1884)
 Moody, Barry (1981). The Acadians, Toronto: Grolier. 96 pages 
 
 
 Notes on Nova Scotian Privateers by George E. E. Nichols. 1904.
 Patterson, Stephen E. "1744–1763: Colonial Wars and Aboriginal Peoples". In Phillip Buckner and John Reid (eds.) The Atlantic Region to Confederation: A History. Toronto: University of Toronto Press. 1994. pp. 125–155
 Patterson, Stephen E. "Indian-White Relations in Nova Scotia, 1749–61: A Study in Political Interaction."   Buckner, P, Campbell, G. and Frank, D. (eds). The Acadiensis Reader Vol 1: Atlantic Canada Before Confederation. 1998. pp. 105–106.
 Patterson, Stephen E. 1744–1763: Colonial Wars and Aboriginal Peoples. In Phillip Buckner and John Reid (eds.) The Atlantic Region to Confederation: A History. Toronto: University of Toronto Press. 1994. pp. 125–155
 Plimsoll, Joseph. The Militia of Nova Scotia, 1749-1867. Collections of the Nova Scotia Historical Society. Vol. 17 (1913). pp. 63–110.
 Rompkey, Ronald, ed. Expeditions of Honour: The Journal of John Salusbury in Halifax, Nova Scotia, 1749–53. Newark: U of Delaware P, Newark, 1982.

 Webster, John Clarence. The career of the Abbé Le Loutre in Nova Scotia (Shediac, N.B., 1933),
 
 John G. Reid. The 'Conquest' of Acadia, 1710: Imperial, Colonial, an Aboriginal Constructions University of Toronto Press. 2004 
 Geoffrey Plank, An Unsettled Conquest. University of Pennsylvania. 2001 
 Annals of Yarmouth and Barrington (Nova Scotia) in the Revolutionary War; compiled from original manuscripts, etc., contained in the office of the secretary of the Commonwealth, State House, Boston, Mass (1899)

External links 
 Government of Nova Scotia transcripts from Journal of John Winslow
 Text of Charles Lawrence's orders to Captain John Handfield - Halifax 11 August 1755
 Nova Scotia Highlanders Regimental Museum
 Nova Scotian Veterans of WW!
 British regiments in Halifax by Date
 Regiments Serving in Nova Scotia
 74-nova-scotia-blacks-served-on-58-civil-war-vessels

 
Military history of Acadia
Conflicts in Nova Scotia
Military history of New England
History of Nova Scotia